The 2009–10 Scottish First Division was the fifteenth season of the First Division in its current format of ten teams.

Club locations

Promotion and relegation from 2008–09

SPL & First Division
Relegated from Premier League to First Division
 Inverness Caledonian Thistle

Promoted from First Division to Scottish Premier League
 St Johnstone

First & Second Divisions
Relegated from First Division to Second Division
 Clyde
Relegated from First Division to Third Division
 Livingston
Promoted from Second Division to First Division
 Raith Rovers
 Ayr United

League table

Results
Teams play each other four times in this league. In the first half of the season each team plays every other team twice (home and away) and then does the same in the second half of the season.

First half of season

Second half of season

Top scorers
Sources:  BBC

First Division play-offs
Times are BST (UTC+1)

Semi-finals
The ninth placed team in the First Division played the fourth placed team in the Second Division and third placed team in the Second Division played the second placed team in the Second Division. The play-offs were played over two legs, the winning team in each semi-final advanced to the final.

First legs

Second legs

Final
The two semi-final winners played each other over two legs. The winning team was awarded a place in the 2010–11 First Division.

First leg

Second leg

Kits and shirt sponsors

Stadia

References

 

Scottish First Division seasons
1
2009–10 in Scottish football leagues
Scot